As a member of the dialect continuum of Romance languages, Catalan displays linguistic features similar to those of its closest neighbors (Occitan, Aragonese). The following features represent in some cases unique changes in the evolution of Catalan from Vulgar Latin; other features are common in other Romance-speaking areas.

Phonology
Catalan is one of the Western Romance languages; it is most closely related to Occitan and only diverged from it between the eleventh and fourteenth centuries after the cultural ties with France were broken. In time, Catalan became more tied to the Ibero-Romance languages in Spain; because these languages are significantly more conservative than French (which has been the most important influence over Occitan in the last several hundred years), most of the differences between Catalan and Occitan are due to developments in Occitan that did not occur in Catalan.

Common features with Western Romance languages, but not Italo-Romance
 Voicing (and lenition) of intervocalic --, --, -- into -b-, -d-, -g- ( 'goat' > cabra,  'chain' > cadena,  'safe' > segur).
 Loss of gemination in stop consonants.
For example,  ('sky, heaven') > Old Catalan cel  > modern  (cf. Italian cielo ).
(This was once common to all Western Romance languages, but has since disappeared from French, some Occitan dialects, and Portuguese.)

Common features with Gallo-Romance languages
 Loss of final unstressed vowels except - ( 'wall' > *muro > mur,  'flower' >flor); cf. the maintenance of all final vowels except - after  in Spanish and Portuguese, e.g. muro but flor; Italo-Romance maintains all final vowels (Italian muro, fiore). However, final voiceless fricatives are voiced before vowels and voiced consonants (regressive voicing assimilation): els homes 'the men'  +  > ; peix bo 'good fish'  +  > . (The same final-obstruent devoicing occurs in all of the Western Romance languages to the extent that obstruents become final, but this is fairly rare in Ibero-Romance. Cf. (Apparent maintenance of -o in first-person singular and -os plurals are likely secondary developments: Old Catalan had no first-person singular -o, and -os plurals occur where they are etymologically unjustified, e.g. peixos "fishes" < , cf. Portuguese peixes.)
Spanish and Portuguese instead raise the vowel to become mid-high; in Spanish, this prevents diphthongization. (But diphthongization between palatals does occur in Aragonese.) Latin  'thigh' > * > cuixa (cf. French cuisse but Portuguese coxa). Latin  'eight' >  > vuit (cf. French huit but Portuguese oito, Spanish ocho; Old Occitan both ueit and och). Latin  'bed' >  > llit (cf. French lit but Portuguese leito, Spanish lecho; Old Occitan both lieig and leit).
 Preservation of initial -, -, - ( 'fold' > aplegar 'to reach',  'key' > clau,  'flame' > flama); cf. palatalization of these initial clusters in Spanish llegar, llave, llama Portuguese chegar, chave, chama. In the Italo-Romance group this slenderization generally replaces the second consonant with -i-  (vocalization); hence Italian piegare, chiave, fiamma.

Common features with Occitan, French, and Portuguese, but not Spanish
Indeed, sound is preserved in all cases, rather than lost in unstressed syllables:  ('freeze') > gelar  (cf. Spanish helar ; but Portuguese, Occitan gelar). ('lay down') > *gieitar > gitar  (cf. Spanish echar; but Portuguese jeitar, Occitan gitar, French jeter).
Voiced sibilants remain as such, whereas in Spanish they merge into voiceless sibilants.
(Gascon actually develops  into  in all circumstances, even before consonants or semi-vowels.)
Intervocalic  (--, --), -- > ll  rather than j ( Old Spanish,  modern):  'wife' > muller,  'ear' > orella,  'old' > . Cf. Spanish mujer, oreja, viejo (but Portuguese mulher, orelha, velho, Occitan molher, French oreille, vieil).
Both Spanish and Middle Occitan have , but Gascon and Languedocian dialects near Catalan, French, and all other Ibero-Romance languages (Portuguese, Leonese, Aragonese) have . E.g.  > *lleit > llet (Cf. Spanish leche, Southern Occitan lach, Northern Occitan lait, Occitan near Catalan lèit, French lait, Portuguese leite).

Common features with Occitano-Romance languages
 Preservation of Vulgar Latin stressed -- and -- (short ⟨ĕ⟩ and ⟨ŏ⟩),  and  respectively ( 'land' > terra,  'honey' > mel,  'fire'> foc ,  'ox'> bou ); cf. Spanish diphthongs in tierra, miel, fuego, buey. French diphthongizes in open syllables, hence miel, Old French buef (modern bœuf ), but terre without diphthong. This same preservation also occurred in Portuguese (terra, mel, fogo, boi). Occitan, but not Catalan, diphthongizes these vowels before velar consonants, i.e.
 Development of late-final  into  (vocalization):  'ship' > nau (cf. Occitan nau, French neuf, Old Spanish non-final nave);  'brief' > breu (cf. Occitan breu, French bref, Old Spanish non-final breve).
 Loss of word-final -:  ('bread') > pa,  ('wine') > vi. (In some Occitan dialects, e.g. Provençal, the consonant was not lost.) Unlike in Languedoc and Northern Catalan, plural forms conserve this : pans, vins.

Common features with Spanish, Portuguese, or French but not Occitan
For example,  'cabbage' > col,  'not much' > poc. (The same development occurred in French.)
Latin  'thigh' > cuixa, Portuguese coxa vs. French cuisse. Latin  'to loosen' (later 'to let') > Catalan and Portuguese deixar, Old Spanish dexar, but French laisser, Old Occitan laisar. Latin  'to lower' > Catalan and Portuguese baixar, Old Spanish baxar, but French baisser. (In Occitan dialects near Catalan and Gascon, there is palatization too: baishar, daishar.)
Intervocalic -- > ll :  ('horse') > cavall (cf. Spanish caballo with  still preserved in conservative rural districts in Spain; Portuguese cavalo, Occitan caval, French cheval, all with simple ). In a few cases,  appears as a result of early simplification of -- after a long vowel:  'town' > vila;  'star' > Western Catalan estrela, Eastern estrella (cf. Spanish estrella, Portuguese estrela < -- but French étoile < --).
 Reduction of consonant cluster -- > m:  'leg' > cama,  'loin' > llom,  > colom (cf. Spanish  lomo,  > paloma but Portuguese lombo, pombo/pomba).  Occurs in some Occitan dialects (Gascon and southern Languedoc).

Features not in Spanish or (most of) Occitan, but found in other minority Romance languages
 Reduction of consonant cluster -- to -n- ( 'to stroll' > andar 'to go' > anar,  'to send, to lead' > manar). Compare reduction of -- to -m-. Also found in Gascon and southern Languedoc.
 Palatalization of initial - ( 'moon' > lluna,  'wolf' > llop). This feature can be found as well in the Foix dialect of Occitan and in Astur-Leonese.
Especially visible in verbs of the third conjugation (-) that took what was originally an inchoative infix (--/--), e.g. 'serves' (present tense, 3rd person singular indicative) > serveix/servix. Found in Aragonese, Leonese and in some Portuguese words. (In Portuguese,  'fish' > peixe,  'to mix' > mexer 'to shake', but most verbs in  end in (s)cer, e.g. 'to grow' > crescer,  'to be born' > nascer,  'to offer' > oferecer.)

Unique features, not found elsewhere
In later Old Catalan,  lost between vowels:
  'foot' > peu
  'cross' > creu,  'he believes' > (ell) creu
 Verbs in second-person plural ending in -:  'you (pl.) look' > *miratz > mirau > mireu/mirau
  'reason' > *razó > raó
  'neighbor' > *vezí > veí
  'to receive' > *rezebre > rebre
 (1) Stressed  >  in most circumstances
 (2) Stressed  >  in most circumstances
 (3) Stressed  maintained as such (in the Balearic Islands);  >  (in Eastern, hence standard, Catalan);  >  (in Western Catalan).
Later augmented by learned borrowings from Classical Latin (latinisms):  ('athlete') > atleta ,  ('intelligent') > intel·ligent . Italian has doubled consonants of all sorts, but for the most part these represent direct preservations from Latin rather than secondary developments. Some dialects of Aragonese (a sister language to Catalan) still preserve  as the reflex of Latin .

Historical development
As a Romance language, Catalan comes directly from Vulgar Latin. As such, it shares certain phonological changes from Latin with other Romance languages:
 Intervocalic consonant lenition, similar to most of Western Romance languages:
 Intervocalic sounds were often voiced (circa fifth century AD).
E.g. caballu > cavall "horse" (this later evolved to [β] in central, northern, and northwestern dialects).
  became  between vowels in Iberia, Gaul, Raetia, northern Italy, and a part of Sardinia.
 Intervocalic pretonic  was deleted in most words.
 In some cases other voiced stops were lost as well. E.g. volebat > volia "s/he wanted", pavore > pahor > por "awe".
 Geminate voiceless stops are simplified. E. g. bucca > boca "mouth", passare > passar  ~  "pass".
 The velars  and  became palatalized before front vowels.
 by the fourth century, palatalized  had become a palatal approximant .  When following a vowel and preceding a stressed vowel, this approximant became fused with the following front vowel:  >  >  > . In the Iberian peninsula, southwestern Gaul, and portions of Sardinia, Sicily, and southwestern Italy, this palatal approximant stage was retained while other dialects made different developments.
 Palatalized , which had developed a palatal offglide (i.e. By the sixth or seventh century, this palatalized coronal had become an affricate ( or ).
  was also part of this palatalization.
 Before or after another consonant  was velarized (leading to l-vocalization in some dialects). After consonants, this may have led to the realization of a palatal lateral in Spanish and Italian.
  was deleted, first when medial and then in all contexts soon after.
  became silent word-finally; nasalization on vowels (represented by  word-finally and  before  and ) is also lost.
  was reduced to  before or after another consonant. By analogy, the prefix ex- before vowels may have also been pronounced . Later on,  was also reduced word-finally except in monosyllabic words.
 ,  and  became palatal between vowels.
There was just general confusion in regards to geminated consonants but they were normally retained after long vowels.
Also, vowel quantity between short mid-vowels and long mid-vowels became differentiated:  > .
 , followed by a fricative (or ), was deleted and replaced by the lengthening of the previous vowel:  > .
 Eventually (in Spain and parts of Gaul), all stressed vowels were pronounced long while unstressed vowels were short. The new long vowels were pronounced in most regions with diphthongization although Portugal, southern Gaul, Lombardy, and Sicily did not participate in this early breaking.
 Vowels were often syncopated.
 between a labial and another consonant.
 when such a deletion brought  to precede another consonant, it became .
 between a consonant and a liquid or vice versa.
 Like Occitan, loss of Latin final unstressed vowels, except -a; and then after some of the resulting consonantic groups a support vowel -e (pronounced [e] or ) appears, e. g. fame > fam "hunger"; bucca > boca "mouth"; nostru > nostre "ours".
 Loss of final -n after the demise of final unstressed vowels, e. g. manu > *man > mà "hand".
 In Oriental dialects: Latin short e > closed , and Latin long e > neutral vowel  and then later > open ; so the final outcome of Latin short and long e is reversed in relation to other Romance languages.
 Unlike Spanish and other Iberian Romance languages, betacism or loss of b/v distinction seems to be in Catalan an innovation since the modern era.
 Like Asturian, palatalization of Latin word initial l-; e.g. luna > lluna "moon"; lupu > llop "wolf".

References

Bibliography
 
 
 

Catalan language
Sound laws